Henrik Sundström was the defending champion, but lost in the quarterfinals to Damir Keretić.

Mats Wilander won the title by defeating Stefan Edberg 6–1, 6–0 in the final.

Seeds

Draw

Finals

Top half

Bottom half

References

External links
 Official results archive (ATP)
 Official results archive (ITF)

Men's Singles
Singles